The Devil's Gondola (Italian: La gondola del diavolo) is a 1946 Italian historical drama-crime film directed by Carlo Campogalliani and starring Loredana, Carlo Lombardi, and Erminio Spalla.

Made by Scalera Films, it was shot at the Cinevillaggio Studios complex in Venice during the wartime Italian Social Republic. The film's sets were designed by the art directors Luigi Scaccianoce and Ottavio Scotti.

Synopsis
In the Venetian Republic a series of murders are carried out by a hooded man in black who always makes his escape through the city's waterways on a gondola.

Cast
 Loredana as Marina
 Carlo Lombardi as messer Stelio Ricunis
 Erminio Spalla as Marco, il gondoliere
 Nino Pavese as Idillius, il bravo
 Alfredo Varelli as Paolo Venier
 Flora Marino as Imperia
 Letizia Quaranta as Madre di Paolo
 Carlo Micheluzzi as Il ministro di giustizia
 Mario Sailer as Lorenzo
 Giorgio Piamonti as Alvise Venier, padre di Paolo
 Edgardo Pellegrini as Bambino
 Giorgio Malvezzi as Uomo bravo
 Roberto Mauri as Altro bravo
 Michael Tor as Oste
 Gianni Cavalieri as ambasciatore di Francia 
 Giorgia Piccoli
 Cristina Veronesi

References

Bibliography
 Klossner, Michael. The Europe of 1500-1815 on film and television: a worldwide filmography of over 2550 works, 1895 through 2000. McFarland & Co., 2002.

External links

1946 films
Italian crime drama films
Italian black-and-white films
Italian historical films
1940s historical films
1946 crime drama films
1940s Italian-language films
Films directed by Carlo Campogalliani
Films shot in Venice
Films set in Venice
1940s Italian films